MK 20 may refer to:

Mk 20 Mod 0, 40mm automatic grenade launcher
MK 20 Rh 202, autocannon with a caliber of 20 mm designed and produced by Rheinmetall
Mk-20 Rockeye, American cluster bomb
MK 20 SSR, a sniper variant of the FN SCAR